David Prosser may refer to:

David Prosser Jr. (born 1942), American jurist, member of the Wisconsin State Supreme Court
David Prosser (bishop) (1868–1950), Archbishop of Wales
Dai Prosser (David Prosser, 1912–1973), Welsh rugby player